Belle Helene is an unincorporated community in Ascension Parish, Louisiana, United States.

History
Belle Helene was named after the Belle Helene Plantation.

References

Unincorporated communities in Ascension Parish, Louisiana
Unincorporated communities in Louisiana